Ascherbach may refer to:

Ascherbach (river), a tributary of the Lichte in Thuringia, Germany
Ascherbach, Lichte, a district of Lichte, Thuringia, Germany